Bābūs (Dari/Pashto: بابوس) is a village in Pul-i Alam District, Logar province, Afghanistan.

Etymology 
Bābūs is made up of the Persian word Bāb (باب) meaning "father" and the Pashto word was (وس) which ultimately stems from Sanskrit वस meaning "dwell", making the meaning "father's dwelling".

References 

Populated places in Logar Province